John Simpson (born in Haydock, St Helens) is a professional basketball player who played in the British Basketball League.

Guard Simpson joined the Liverpool-based Everton Tigers from local-rivals Cheshire Jets during the summer of 2007, ending a three-year spell at the club.

References

Living people
Year of birth missing (living people)
Cheshire Jets players
English men's basketball players
Doping cases in basketball
English sportspeople in doping cases
Mersey Tigers players
Sportspeople from St Helens, Merseyside